Sanerzai is a subtribe of Essakhail Kakar, living in the north of Ziarat valley, Pakistan. It is the leading tribe in the district, although with a less population as compared to other tribes residing in Ziarat. 
The grandfather of the tribe is known as Saner Khan and the tribe is named after Saner Khan. The first forefather of this tribe who migrated to Ziarat was Musa Khan. Musa Khan also known as Musa Neka migrated to the district during the return of Ahmad Shah Abdali in 1761 from the Third Battle of Panipat. He was basically from Esakhail tribe of Muslim Bagh. 
The dominant area of Sanerzai's is "Chawatra", which is famous for its beautiful waterfall of Sandman Tangi.

Social groups of Pakistan